Adaichani is a village panchayat situated in the Tirunelveli locale of Tamil Nadu state, India. It is surrounded by Pallakkal Pothukudi, Edaikal, and Papakudi.

Villages in Tirunelveli district